This article presents the complete discography of American guitarist and music producer Andy Hawkins, including his work as a band member and as a collaborating artist. He is most recognized as the guitarist and primary composer for the instrumental post-hardcore outfit Blind Idiot God. He released his debut solo album, titled Halo, under the moniker Azonic.

As a Solo artist

With Blind Idiot God

Studio albums

Singles

Compilation appearances

Other credits

References

External links

Discographies of American artists
Rock music discographies